The Indigenous Revolutionary Armed Forces of the Pacific (Spanish: Fuerzas Armadas Revolucionarias Indígenas del Pacífico) is a small guerrilla group based in rural indigenous areas of Colombia.

The group, known by the acronym of FARIP, is an indigenous revolutionary group, common government estimates give the group a total number of 80 fighters. It is speculated that, like the largely peaceful ONIC (National Indigenous Organization of Colombia) and other indigenous self-defense forces, to be poorly armed.

Colombian guerrilla movements